Collinwood High School may refer to:

Collinwood High School (Cleveland), in Ohio, United States
Collinwood High School (Tennessee), United States